A Typical and Autoctonal Venezuelan Dance Band is the debut album by the Venezuelan band Los Amigos Invisibles, released in 1995.

The cover logo was designed by José Andrés Blanco, the lead singer of King Changó. David Byrne, who later signed the band to his label, was first attracted to the album cover.

Track listing
"Dame tu Color"
"En El Cielo o En Tu Boca"
"Díme"
"El Humo Que Respiro Cuando Estoy Contigo"
"Nada Que Decir"
"Siente"
"Biicuaiet"
"Vuelo Hasta Tus Pies"
"Guffi's Mix"
"Encántame"
"Pelusa"
"Dialecto Divino"
"Porno Song"
"¿En Dónde Está Lo Bello?"
"Mauri's Mix"
"Acid Jazz De Las Mujeres Locas"
"Más Dulce"
"Boogaloo Pa' Los Panas"
"Vámonos"
"Última Pieza"

References

1995 debut albums
Los Amigos Invisibles albums